Inka Wasi (Quechua inka Inca, wasi house, "Inca house", also spelled Inca Huasi) is a  mountain in the Bolivian Andes. It is located in the Chuquisaca Department, Azurduy Province, Tarvita Municipality. Inka Wasi lies southwest of Muyu Urqu and north of Pukara. The Laqha Mayu ("dark river") originates north of the mountain. Its waters flow to the Pillku Mayu (Quechua for "red river").

References 

Mountains of Chuquisaca Department